Zhoukoudian Peking Man Site, also romanized as Choukoutien,  is a cave system in suburban Fangshan District, Beijing. It has yielded many archaeological discoveries, including one of the first specimens of Homo erectus (Homo erectus pekinensis), dubbed Peking Man, and a fine assemblage of bones of the gigantic hyena Pachycrocuta brevirostris.

Due to differing interpretations of the evidence, proposed dates for when Peking Man inhabited this site vary greatly, including: 700,000–200,000 years ago, 670,000–470,000 years ago, or no earlier than 530,000 years ago.

The Peking Man Site was first discovered by Johan Gunnar Andersson in 1921, and was first excavated by Otto Zdansky in 1921 and 1923, unearthing two human teeth. These were later identified by Davidson Black as belonging to a previously unknown species, and extensive excavations followed. Fissures in the limestone-containing middle Pleistocene deposits have yielded the remains of about 45 individuals, as well as animal remains, and stone flake and chopping tools.

The oldest animal remains date from as early as 690,000 years ago, with tools as old as 670,000 years ago, while another authority dates the tools found as no earlier than 530,000 years ago. During the Upper Palaeolithic, the site was re-occupied, and remains of Homo sapiens and their stone and bone tools have also been recovered from the Upper Cave.

The crater Choukoutien on asteroid 243 Ida was named after the location. The caves are located in Zhoukoudian Town, Fangshan District, southwest of central Beijing.

Excavation history

Discovery

Swedish geologist Johan Gunnar Andersson first started his explorations of the region in 1918 at an area called Chicken-bone Hill by locals who had misidentified the rodent fossils that were found in abundance there, but it was not until 1921 that he and American palaeontologist Walter W. Granger were led to the site known as Dragon Bone Hill by local quarry men. Noticing some white quartz that was foreign to the area, he immediately realised that this would be a good place to search for the remains of primitive man.

Excavations were undertaken by Andersson's assistant, Austrian palaeontologist Otto Zdansky in 1921 and 1923, unearthing a great deal of material that was sent back to Uppsala University in Sweden for further analysis. In 1926, Anderson announced the discovery of two human molars amongst this material, and the following year Zdansky published his finding, cautiously identifying the teeth as ?Homo sp.

Sometimes called the Zhoukidian wolf, Canis variabilis fossils were found at the Zhoukoudian cave system and archaeological site in 1934, and named by their discoverer, Pei Wenzhong:

Zhoukoudian Project
Canadian paleoanthropologist Davidson Black, who was working for the Peking Union Medical College at the time, was excited by Andersson and Zdansky's find, and applied to the Rockefeller Foundation for funding to undertake a systematic excavation of the site. Funding was granted, and the Zhoukoudian Project commenced excavations in 1927 under the supervision of Chinese archaeologist Li Jie.

That fall, a tooth was unearthed by Swedish paleontologist Anders Birger Bohlin, which Black proposed belonged to a new species dubbed Sinanthropus pekinensis. The following year, Black's excavations uncovered more fossils of his new species, including teeth, a substantial part of a juvenile's jaw, and an adult jaw complete with three teeth. These finds allowed Black to secure an additional $80,000 grant from the Foundation, which he used to establish a research laboratory.

Cenozoic Research Laboratory
The Cenozoic Research Laboratory of the Geological Survey of China was established at the Peking Union Medical College in 1928 with the assistance of Chinese geologists Ding Wenjiang and Weng Wenhao, for the research and appraisal of the fossils unearthed. Black stayed on at the Laboratory as honorary director, while excavations continued at the site under Chinese paleontologist Yang Zhongjian, anthropologists Pei Wenzhong, and Jia Lanpo.

Conditions at the site were primitive, with scientists having to ride out to the excavation on mules and staying at caravansaries along the way. When the first skullcap was unearthed at the site in 1929, it was done by Pei, working in a 40-meter crevasse in frigid weather, with a hammer in one hand and a candle in the other. A second skullcap was discovered close to the first in 1930, and by 1932 nearly 100 workers were deployed at the site each day.

Despite the conditions at the site, eminent researchers continued to visit. French palaeontologist Pierre Teilhard de Chardin had been a regular visitor to the site since 1926. French archaeologist Henri Breuil visited in 1931 and confirmed the presence of stone tools. That same year, evidence of the use of fire at the cave was accepted.

The ever-industrious Black died one night at his office in 1934, with one of the skullcaps unearthed at the site on his desk. German Jewish anthropologist Franz Weidenreich replaced him as honorary director of the Laboratory, and excavations continued, uncovering a further three skullcaps in 1936.

Altogether, excavations uncovered 200 human fossils from more than 40 individuals, including 5 nearly complete skullcaps, before they were brought to a halt in 1937 by the Japanese invasion of China. Reports of Japanese atrocities include the torture and murder of workers at the site, with three bayoneted to death, and a fourth forced to pull a rickshaw until dying of starvation.

In 1941, the bulk of the finds were lost, never to be recovered, while in transport to safety. Fortunately, Weidenreich had made copies of the fossils to preserve their physical characteristics.

Postwar excavations
Excavation work was recommenced in 1949, unearthing new Peking Man fossils, including 5 teeth and fragments of thigh and shin bone. The following year, a third premolar was discovered in the material sent back to Uppsala by Zdansky in 1921 and 1923.

The Peking Man Site was designated "Type section of cave deposits of Middle Pleistocene in North China" by the Annual Congress of the National Committee of Stratigraphy of China in 1959, and a mandible fragment was unearthed.

Excavations led by Pei in 1966 unearthed a premolar and two pieces of skull fragment – these were discovered to match fragments retained from previous excavations in 1934 and 1936, and the only extant example of a nearly complete skullcap was pieced together.

Excavations at Locality 4 in Zhoukoudian, from 1972–73, unearthed a Homo sapiens premolar.

Modern scientific dating techniques confirm that the site was occupied between 230,000 and 500,000 years ago.

Excavation sites

Peking Man Site

Locality 1, also known as Peking Man Site, was the first to be discovered, in 1921, under the direction of local quarry men. The site was originally a natural limestone cave, although the roof had long since collapsed, spreading a layer of breccia and rubble across the top of the deposits. Early excavations in 1921 and 1923 revealed evidence of human habitation from 200,000 to 500,000 years ago. The cave was excavated from 1927-37, yielding 200 human fossils (from 40 individuals) identified as Homo erectus, more than 10,000 lithic pieces, several cinder layers indicating fire use in early man, as well as animal fossils from 200 separate species. The bulk of this material was lost in 1941 during the Japanese occupation and has never been recovered. Excavations recommenced in 1949 and continued to yield fossils and artefacts, making this site one of the most fruitful sources of material from the Middle Pleistocene era.

A total of 13 layers have been excavated at the site to a depth of nearly 40 m.

Layers below this have been shown by test-pit excavation not to contain fossils or lithics and have never been excavated.

Upper Cave

Situated on the upper part of Dragon Bone Hill, this cave was discovered in 1930, and excavated from 1933–34, during which time the roof and north-facing opening were removed. Excavations found evidence of human habitation in the cave dating back to 10,000 to 20,000 years ago. The cave was divided into an upper-level living quarters, and a lower-level burial ground, while a small recess on the lower level acted as a natural animal trap.  Finds unearthed included three human skulls, and other remains from at least eight individuals identified as archaic Homo sapiens, tools and ornaments made from stone and bone, and numerous animal bones, including complete skeletons of large mammals caught in the lower-level trap. Also, white powder sprinkled around the remains on the lower level indicated the inhabitants practiced burial rites.

Other localities
More than 20 fossil-bearing localities have been excavated in Zhoukoudian to date.

Gallery

See also

 List of fossil sites (with link directory)
 List of hominina (hominid) fossils (with images)
 List of quaternary mammalian fauna of China
 List of World Heritage Sites in China
 Peking Man

References

External links
 The Peking Man World Heritage Site at Zhoukoudian
 Weidenreich, Franz. 1943. The Skull of Sinanthropus pekinensis; A Comparative Study on a Primitive Hominid Skull
 Zhoukoudian Tourism Guide

Archaeological museums in China
Caves of Beijing
Cenozoic paleontological sites of Asia
Buildings and structures in Fangshan District
Karst formations of China
Limestone caves
Major National Historical and Cultural Sites in Beijing
Museums in Beijing
National archaeological parks of China
National first-grade museums of China
Paleoanthropological sites
Paleolithic sites in China
World Heritage Sites in China